Drinking water is water that is used in drink or food preparation; potable water is water that is safe to be used as drinking water. The amount of drinking water required to maintain good health varies, and depends on physical activity level, age, health-related issues, and environmental conditions. Recent work showed that the most important driver of water turnover which is closely linked to water requirements is energy expenditure. For those who work in a hot climate, up to  a day may be required. Typically in developed countries, tap water meets drinking water quality standards, even though only a small proportion is actually consumed or used in food preparation. Other typical uses for tap water include washing, toilets, and irrigation. Greywater may also be used for toilets or irrigation. Its use for irrigation however may be associated with risks. Water may also be unacceptable due to levels of toxins or suspended solids.

Globally, by 2015, 89% of people had access to water from a source that is suitable for drinkingcalled improved water source. In sub-Saharan Africa, access to potable water ranged from 40% to 80% of the population. Nearly 4.2 billion people worldwide had access to tap water, while another 2.4 billion had access to wells or public taps. The World Health Organization considers access to safe drinking-water a basic human right.

About 1 to 2 billion people lack safe drinking water. Water can carry vectors of disease. More people die from unsafe water than from war, then-U.N. secretary-general Ban Ki-moon said in 2010. Third world countries are most affected by lack of water, flooding, and water quality. Up to 80 percent of illnesses in developing countries are the direct result of inadequate water and sanitation. According to a report by UNICEF and UNESCO, Finland has the best drinking water quality in the world.

Water resources

Water covers approximately 70% of the Earth's surface, where approximately 97.2% of it is saline, only 2.8% fresh. Potable water is available in almost all populated areas of the Earth, although it may be expensive and the supply may not always be sustainable. Sources where water may be obtained include springs, hyporheic zones and aquifers, and:
 Precipitation which includes rain, hail, snow, fog, etc.
 Surface water such as rivers, streams, glaciers
 Biological sources such as plants
 Desalinated seawater
 Water supply network
 Atmospheric water generators
Threats for the availability of water resources include: water scarcity, water pollution, water conflict, insufficient well-depth, droughts and overpumping, and the effects of climate change.

Consumption

Requirements for drinking

The amount of drinking water required per day is variable. It depends on physical activity, age, health, and environmental conditions. The common advice to drink 8 glasses of plain water per day is not based on science, and an individual's thirst provides a better guide for how much water they require rather than a specific, fixed quantity. Physical exercise and heat exposure cause loss of water and therefore may induce thirst and greater water intake.

The drinking water contribution to mineral nutrients intake is also unclear. Inorganic minerals generally enter surface water and ground water via storm water runoff or through the Earth's crust. Treatment processes also lead to the presence of some minerals. Examples include calcium, zinc, manganese, phosphate, fluoride and sodium compounds. Water generated from the biochemical metabolism of nutrients provides a significant proportion of the daily water requirements for some arthropods and desert animals, but provides only a small fraction of a human's necessary intake. There are a variety of trace elements present in virtually all potable water, some of which play a role in metabolism. For example, sodium, potassium and chloride are common chemicals found in small quantities in most waters, and these elements play a role in body metabolism. Other elements such as fluoride, while beneficial in low concentrations, can cause dental problems and other issues when present at high levels.

Fluid balance is key. Profuse sweating can increase the need for electrolyte (salt) replacement. Water intoxication (which results in hyponatremia), the process of consuming too much water too quickly, can be fatal. Water makes up about 60% of the body weight in men and 55% of weight in women. A baby is composed of about 70% to 80% water while the elderly are composed of around 45%.

Household usage

Of this, only 1% of the water provided by public water suppliers is for drinking and cooking. Uses include (in decreasing order) toilets, washing machines, showers, baths, faucets, and leaks.

Animals
The qualitative and quantitative aspects of drinking water requirements on domesticated animals are studied and described within the context of animal husbandry. However, relatively few studies have been focused on the drinking behavior of wild animals.

Water supply 

The most efficient and convenient way to transport and deliver potable water is through pipes. Plumbing can require significant capital investment. Some systems suffer high operating costs. The cost to replace the deteriorating water and sanitation infrastructure of industrialized countries may be as high as $200 billion a year. Leakage of untreated and treated water from pipes reduces access to water. Leakage rates of 50% are not uncommon in urban systems.

Springs are often used as sources for bottled waters. Tap water, delivered by domestic water systems refers to water piped to homes and delivered to a tap or spigot. For these water sources to be consumed safely, they must receive adequate treatment and meet drinking water regulations.

Because of the high initial investments, many less wealthy nations cannot afford to develop or sustain appropriate infrastructure, and as a consequence people in these areas may spend a correspondingly higher fraction of their income on water. 2003 statistics from El Salvador, for example, indicate that the poorest 20% of households spend more than 10% of their total income on water. In the United Kingdom, authorities define spending of more than 3% of one's income on water as a hardship.

Water quality 

According to the World Health Organization's 2017 report, safe drinking-water is water that "does not represent any significant risk to health over a lifetime of consumption, including different sensitivities that may occur between life stages".

Parameters for drinking water quality typically fall within three categories: physical, chemical, microbiological.

Physical and chemical parameters include heavy metals, trace organic compounds, total suspended solids, and turbidity. Chemical parameters tend to pose more of a chronic health risk through buildup of heavy metals although some components like nitrates/nitrites and arsenic can have a more immediate impact. Physical parameters affect the aesthetics and taste of the drinking water and may complicate the removal of microbial pathogens.

Microbiological parameters include coliform bacteria, E. coli, and specific pathogenic species of bacteria (such as cholera-causing Vibrio cholerae), viruses, and protozoan parasites. Originally, fecal contamination was determined with the presence of coliform bacteria, a convenient marker for a class of harmful fecal pathogens. The presence of fecal coliforms (like E. Coli) serves as an indication of contamination by sewage. Additional contaminants include protozoan oocysts such as Cryptosporidium sp., Giardia lamblia, Legionella, and viruses (enteric). Microbial pathogenic parameters are typically of greatest concern because of their immediate health risk.

Throughout most of the world, the most common contamination of raw water sources is from human sewage in particular human fecal pathogens and parasites. In 2006, waterborne diseases were estimated to cause 1.8 million deaths while about 1.1 billion people lacked proper drinking water. In parts of the world, the only sources of water are from small streams that are often directly contaminated by sewage.

Pesticides, whether used in agriculture or domestically (e.g. homes, schools, businesses) are potential drinking water contaminants. Pesticides may be present in drinking water in low concentrations, but the toxicity of the chemical and the extent of human exposure are factors that are used to determine the specific health risk.

Perfluorinated alkylated substances (PFAS) are a group of synthetic compounds used in a large variety of consumer products, such as food packaging, waterproof fabrics, carpeting and cookware. PFAS are known to persist in the environment and are commonly described as persistent organic pollutants. PFAS chemicals have been detected in blood, both humans and animals, worldwide, as well as in food products, water, air and soil. Animal testing studies with PFAS have shown effects on growth and development, and possibly effects on reproduction, thyroid, the immune system and liver. As of 2022 the health impacts of many PFAS compounds are not understood. Scientists are conducting research to determine the extent and severity of impacts from PFAS on human health. PFAS have been widely detected in drinking water worldwide and regulations have been developed, or are under development, in many countries.

Water treatment

Most water requires some treatment before use; even water from deep wells or springs. The extent of treatment depends on the source of the water. Appropriate technology options in water treatment include both community-scale and household-scale point-of-use (POU) designs. Only a few large urban areas such as Christchurch, New Zealand have access to sufficiently pure water of sufficient volume that no treatment of the raw water is required.

In emergency situations when conventional treatment systems have been compromised, waterborne pathogens may be killed or inactivated by boiling but this requires abundant sources of fuel, and can be very onerous on consumers, especially where it is difficult to store boiled water in sterile conditions. Other techniques, such as filtration, chemical disinfection, and exposure to ultraviolet radiation (including solar UV) have been demonstrated in an array of randomized control trials to significantly reduce levels of water-borne disease among users in low-income countries, but these suffer from the same problems as boiling methods.

Another type of water treatment is called desalination and is used mainly in dry areas with access to large bodies of saltwater.

Point of use methods

The ability of point of use (POU) options to reduce disease is a function of both their ability to remove microbial pathogens if properly applied and such social factors as ease of use and cultural appropriateness. Technologies may generate more (or less) health benefit than their lab-based microbial removal performance would suggest.

The current priority of the proponents of POU treatment is to reach large numbers of low-income households on a sustainable basis. Few POU measures have reached significant scale thus far, but efforts to promote and commercially distribute these products to the world's poor have only been under way for a few years.

Solar water disinfection is a low-cost method of purifying water that can often be implemented with locally available materials. Unlike methods that rely on firewood, it has low impact on the environment.

Global access 

According to the World Health Organization (WHO), "access to safe drinking-water is essential to health, a basic human right and a component of effective policy for health protection." In 1990, only 76 percent of the global population had access to drinking water. By 2015 that number had increased to 91 percent. In 1990, most countries in Latin America, East and South Asia, and Sub-Saharan Africa were well below 90%. In Sub-Saharan Africa, where the rates are lowest, household access ranges from 40 to 80 percent. Countries that experience violent conflict can have reductions in drinking water access: One study found that a conflict with about 2,500 battle deaths deprives 1.8% of the population of potable water.

By 2015, 5.2 billion people representing 71% of the global population used safely managed drinking water services. As of 2017, 90% of people having access to water from a source that is suitable for drinkingcalled improved water sourceand 71% of the world could access safely managed drinking water that is clean and available on-demand. Estimates suggest that at least 25% of improved sources contain fecal contamination. 1.8 billion people still use an unsafe drinking water source which may be contaminated by feces. This can result in infectious diseases, such as gastroenteritis, cholera, and typhoid, among others. Reduction of waterborne diseases and development of safe water resources is a major public health goal in developing countries. In 2017, almost 22 million Americans drank from water systems that were in violation of public health standards, which could contribute to citizens developing water-borne illnesses. Safe drinking water is an environmental health concern. Bottled water is sold for public consumption in most parts of the world.

Improved sources are also monitored based on whether water is available when needed (5.8 billion people), located on premises (5.4 billion), free from contamination (5.4 billion), and within a 30-minute round trip. While improved water sources such as protected piped water are more likely to provide safe and adequate water as they may prevent contact with human excreta, for example, this is not always the case. According to a 2014 study, approximately 25% of improved sources contained fecal contamination.

The population in Australia, New Zealand, North America and Europe have achieved nearly universal basic drinking water services.

As of 2015, American households use an average of 300 gallons of water a day.

Monitoring 
The WHO/UNICEF Joint Monitoring Program (JMP) for Water Supply and Sanitation is the official United Nations mechanism tasked with monitoring progress towards the Millennium Development Goal (MDG) relating to drinking-water and sanitation (MDG 7, Target 7c), which is to: "Halve, by 2015, the proportion of people without sustainable access to safe drinking-water and basic sanitation".

Access to safe drinking water is indicated by safe water sources. These improved drinking water sources include household connection, public standpipe, borehole condition, protected dug well, protected spring, and rain water collection. Sources that do not encourage improved drinking water to the same extent as previously mentioned include: unprotected wells, unprotected springs, rivers or ponds, vender-provided water, bottled water (consequential of limitations in quantity, not quality of water), and tanker truck water. Access to sanitary water comes hand in hand with access to improved sanitation facilities for excreta, such as connection to public sewer, connection to septic system, or a pit latrine with a slab or water seal.

According to this indicator on improved water sources, the MDG was met in 2010, five years ahead of schedule. Over 2 billion more people used improved drinking water sources in 2010 than did in 1990. However, the job is far from finished. 780 million people are still without improved sources of drinking water, and many more people still lack safe drinking water. Estimates suggest that at least 25% of improved sources contain fecal contamination and an estimated 1.8 billion people globally use a source of drinking water that suffers from fecal contamination. The quality of these sources varies over time and often gets worse during the wet season. Continued efforts are needed to reduce urban-rural disparities and inequities associated with poverty; to dramatically increase safe drinking water coverage in countries in sub-Saharan Africa and Oceania; to promote global monitoring of drinking water quality; and to look beyond the MDG target towards universal coverage.

Definitions

A "safely managed drinking water service" is "one located on premises, available when needed and free from contamination". 

The terms 'improved water source' and 'unimproved water source' were coined in 2002 as a drinking water monitoring tool by the JMP of UNICEF and WHO. The term, improved water source refers to "piped water on premises (piped household water connection located inside the user’s dwelling, plot or yard), and other improved drinking water sources (public taps or standpipes, tube wells or boreholes, protected dug wells, protected springs, and rainwater collection)".

International development 
Expanding WASH (Water, Sanitation and Hygiene) coverage and monitoring in non-household settings such as schools, healthcare facilities, and work places, is included in Sustainable Development Goal 6.

WaterAid International is a non-governmental organization (NGO) that works on improving the availability of safe drinking water in some the world's poorest countries.  

Sanitation and Water for All is a partnership that brings together national governments, donors, UN agencies, NGOs and other development partners. They work to improve sustainable access to sanitation and water supply to meet and go beyond the MDG target. In 2014, 77 countries had already met the MDG sanitation target, 29 were on track and, 79 were not on-track.

Health aspects

Contaminated water is estimated to result in more than half a million deaths per year. Contaminated water with the lack of sanitation was estimated to cause about one percent of disability adjusted life years worldwide in 2010. As contaminated water takes its toll on the health of those exposed, the duration of exposure plays a part in the effects of certain diseases.

Diarrheal diseases

Over 90% of deaths from diarrheal diseases in the developing world today occur in children under five years old. According to the WHO, the most common diseases linked with poor water quality are cholera, diarrhoea, dysentery, hepatitis A, typhoid, and polio. Malnutrition, especially protein-energy malnutrition, can decrease the children's resistance to infections, including water-related diarrheal diseases. Between 2000 and 2003, 769,000 children under five years old in sub-Saharan Africa died each year from diarrheal diseases. As a result from poor water quality and bad sanitation, an estimated 829,000 people die each year from diarrhoea. Only thirty-six percent of the population in the sub-Saharan region have access to proper means of sanitation. More than 2,000 children's lives are lost every day. In South Asia, 683,000 children under five years old died each year from diarrheal disease from 2000 to 2003. During the same period, in developed countries, 700 children under five years old died from diarrheal disease. Improved water supply reduces diarrhea morbidity by 25% and improvements in drinking water through proper storage in the home and chlorination reduces diarrhea episodes by 39%.

Groundwater pollution

Some efforts at increasing the availability of safe drinking water have been disastrous. When the 1980s were declared the "International Decade of Water" by the United Nations, the assumption was made that groundwater is inherently safer than water from rivers, ponds, and canals. While instances of cholera, typhoid and diarrhea were reduced, other problems emerged due to polluted groundwater.

Sixty million people are estimated to have been poisoned by well water contaminated by excessive fluoride, which dissolved from granite rocks. The effects are particularly evident in the bone deformations of children. Similar or larger problems are anticipated in other countries including China, Uzbekistan, and Ethiopia. Although helpful for dental health in low dosage, fluoride in large amounts interferes with bone formation.

Half of Bangladesh's 12 million tube wells contain unacceptable levels of arsenic due to the wells not dug deep enough (past 100 meters). The Bangladeshi government had spent less than US$7 million of the 34 million allocated for solving the problem by the World Bank in 1998. Natural arsenic poisoning is a global threat with 140 million people affected in 70 countries globally. These examples illustrate the need to examine each location on a case-by-case basis and not assume what works in one area will work in another.

Regulations

Guidelines for the assessment and improvement of service activities relating to drinking water have been published in the form of drinking water quality standards such as ISO 24510.

For example, the EU sets legislation on water quality. Directive 2000/60/EC of the European Parliament and of the Council of 23 October 2000 establishing a framework for Community action in the field of water policy, known as the water framework directive, is the primary piece of legislation governing water. This drinking water directive relates specifically to water intended for human consumption. Each member state is responsible for establishing the required policing measures to ensure that the legislation is implemented. For example, in the UK the Water Quality Regulations prescribe maximum values for substances that affect wholesomeness and the Drinking Water Inspectorate polices the water companies.

In the United States, public water systems, defined as systems that serve more than 25 customers or 15 service connections, are regulated by the U.S. Environmental Protection Agency (EPA) under the Safe Drinking Water Act.  As of 2019 the EPA has issued 88 standards for microorganisms, chemicals and radionuclides. The Food and Drug Administration regulates bottled water as a food product under the Federal Food, Drug, and Cosmetic Act. All public water suppliers in the US must uphold a certain standard of water quality. If the requirements are met, Americans can drink their local tap water.

New Zealand 
The Water Services Act 2021 brought Taumata Arowai' into existence as the new regulator of drinking water and waste water treatment in New Zealand. Initial activities including the establishment of a national register of water suppliers and establishing a network of accredited laboratories for drinking water and waste water analysis

Singapore 
Singapore is a significant importer of water from neighbouring Malaysia but also has a made great efforts to reclaim as much used water as possible to enure adequate provision for the very crowded city/state. Their reclaimed water is marketed as NEWater. Singapore updated its water quality regulation in 2019 setting standards consistent with WHO recommended standards. Monitoring is undertaken by the Environmental Public Health Department of the Singaporean Government

United Kingdom 
In the United Kingdom regulation of water supplies is a devolved matter to the Welsh and Scottish Parliaments and the Northern Ireland Assembly.

In England and Wales there are two water industry regulatory authorities.

 Water Services Regulation Authority (Ofwat) is the economic regulator of the water sector; it protects the interests of consumers by promoting effective competition and ensuring that water companies carry out their statutory functions. Ofwat has a management board comprising a Chairman, Chief Executive and Executive and Non-Executive members. There is a staff of about 240.
 The Drinking Water Inspectorate (DWI) provides independent assurance that the privatised water industry delivers safe, clean drinking water to consumers. The DWI was established in 1990 and comprises a Chief Inspector of Drinking Water and a team of about 40 people. The current standards of water quality are defined in Statutory Instrument 2016 No. 614 the Water Supply (Water Quality) Regulations 2016.

The functions and duties of the bodies are formally defined in the Water Industry Act 1991 (1991 c. 56) as amended by the Water Act 2003 (2003 c. 37) and the Water Act 2014 (2014 c. 21).

In Scotland water quality is the responsibility of independent Drinking Water Quality Regulator (DWQR).

In Northern Ireland the Drinking Water Inspectorate (DWI) regulates drinking water quality of public and private supplies. The current standards of water quality are defined in the Water Supply (Water Quality) Regulations (Northern Ireland) 2017.

United States 
The Safe Drinking Water Act requires the U.S. Environmental Protection Agency (EPA) to set standards for drinking water quality in public water systems (entities that provide water for human consumption to at least 25 people for at least 60 days a year). Enforcement of the standards is mostly carried out by state health agencies. States may set standards that are more stringent than the federal standards.

EPA has set standards for over 90 contaminants organized into six groups: microorganisms, disinfectants, disinfection byproducts, inorganic chemicals, organic chemicals and radionuclides.

EPA also identifies and lists unregulated contaminants which may require regulation. The Contaminant Candidate List is published every five years, and EPA is required to decide whether to regulate at least five or more listed contaminants.

Local drinking water utilities may apply for low interest loans, to make facility improvements, through the Drinking Water State Revolving Fund.

See also

 Boil-water advisory
 Human right to water and sanitation
List of water supply and sanitation by country
 Water filter
 Water fluoridation
 Water intoxication
 Water security
 Water quality

References

External links

 U.S. Centers for Disease Control and Prevention (CDC) Healthy Water – Drinking Water One-stop resource for drinking water
 US Environmental Protection Agency – National drinking water program – General info, regulations & technical publications
 WHO – Water Sanitation and Health: drinking water quality

 
Sanitation